Sorcerer is a 1985 pinball machine designed by Mark Ritchie and released by Williams Electronics. The table is placed in the "Internet Pinball Data Base Top 100 Rated Electronic Pinball Machines" chart.

Description
The artwork of Sorcerer is very colorful with orange and light yellow on a black cabinet. The backglass and playfield featuring the sorcerer and dragons. Several playfield plastics are extensions of the playfield art. The slingshot plastics represents a further part of the sorcerer's beard and the sorcerer's hand is depicted by the plastic over the targets. This design creates a 3D effect. The Sorcerer's eyes on the back plastic panel glow and flash along with the gameplay. When the player earns an extra ball, a bell rings that sounds like an old fire alarm.

Gameplay
Scoring is evenly split around the playfield. The drop targets can be hit with the third flipper. The top rollovers advance the multiplier. The playfield contains six standup targets that along with the 2 spinners can be hit to spell SORCERER.
A ramp along top left locks a first ball. A second ball up the ramp releases the first and second balls for 2-ball play that has a multiplier for the duration of multiball play.

Digital versions
Sorcerer is available in the Wii, PlayStation 3, PlayStation Portable, and the Xbox 360 versions of Pinball Hall of Fame: The Williams Collection. The table was later added to Pinball Hall of Fames successor The Pinball Arcade on February 2, 2018 and taken down from all possible digital stores on June 30, 2018 due to WMS license expiration. Sorcerer was also included in the arcade game UltraPin.

References

External links
IPDB listing for Sorcerer

Williams pinball machines
1985 pinball machines